The 2023 season is the 111th season of competitive soccer in the United States. The season will begin with Friendlies for the USMNT and USWNT in January.

National teams

Men's

Senior

.

Friendlies

CONCACAF Nations League

Group D

Continental Clásico

Goalscorers
Goals are current as of January 28, 2023, after the match against .

U–20

FIFA U-20 World Cup

Group

U–17

CONCACAF U-17 Championship

Group F

Knockout stage

FIFA U-17 World Cup

Group

Women's

Senior

.

Friendlies

SheBelieves Cup

2023 FIFA Women's World Cup

Group E

Goalscorers
Goals are current as of February 22, 2023, after the match against .

Club competitions

Men's

League competitions

Major League Soccer

Conference tables 

 Eastern Conference

 Western Conference

Overall 2023 table 
Note: the table below has no impact on playoff qualification and is used solely for determining host of the MLS Cup, certain CCL spots, the Supporters' Shield trophy, seeding in the 2024 Canadian Championship, and 2023 MLS draft. The conference tables are the sole determinant for teams qualifying for the playoffs.

MLS Playoffs

MLS Cup

MLS All-Star Game

USL Championship

Conference tables 
Eastern Conference

Western Conference

USL League One

MLS Next Pro

Eastern Conference

Western Conference

Overall table

National Independent Soccer Association

Cup competitions

US Open Cup

International competitions

FIFA Club World Cup

2nd round

|}

CONCACAF competitions

CONCACAF Champions League

teams in bold are still active in the competition

Round of 16

|}

Quarter-finals

|}

Leagues Cup

Group stage

West

Central

South

East

Campeones Cup

Los Angeles FC

Honors

Professional

Amateur

References

Notes

External links
US Soccer Schedule
US Soccer Results
CONCACAF
MLS
NWSL
USL
USL1
NISA
MLS Next Pro

 
Seasons in American soccer
Soccer